The 17th Anti-aircraft Artillery Regiment "Sforzesca" is an anti-aircraft artillery regiment of the Italian Army. Originally founded as a field artillery regiment the unit transferred to the anti-aircraft specialty on 1 July 1953. Today the regiment is based in Sabaudia in Lazio and administratively assigned to the Anti-aircraft Artillery Command.

Current Structure
As of 2022 the 17th Anti-aircraft Artillery Regiment "Sforzesca" consists of:

  Regimental Command, in Sabaudia
 Command and Logistic Support Battery
 1st Anti-aircraft Group
 1st Battery (Stinger)
 2nd Battery (Stinger)
 3rd Battery (Skyguard "Aspide")
 Fire Control and Support Battery

The Command and Logistic Support Battery fields the following sections: C3 Section, Transport and Materiel Section, Medical Section, and Commissariat Section. The Anti-aircraft Group's Skyguard "Aspide" surface-to-air missile systems will be replaced with CAMM-ER systems in the near future.

The 17th Anti-aircraft Artillery Regiment "Sforzesca" contributes two V-SHORAD batteries to the Italian military's National Sea Projection Capability (Forza di proiezione dal mare), which consists of the Italian Army's Cavalry Brigade "Pozzuolo del Friuli" and the Italian Navy's 3rd Naval Division and San Marco Marine Brigade.

External links
Italian Army Website: 17° Reggimento Artiglieria Controaerei "Sforzesca"

References

Artillery Regiments of Italy